Mara Povoleri (born 20 October 1950), better known as Mara Venier, is an Italian actress, and television presenter.

Career
Venier made her debut with a main role in Diario di un italiano, a TV-series based on the novel Wanda written by Vasco Pratolini. She later starred in several films and TV-series, including Nanni Loy's Testa o croce and Pacco, doppio pacco e contropaccotto. She debuted as television hostess at 38, in the musical show Una rotonda sul mare, but her television career was launched in 1993 with the show Domenica in that she hosted until 1996 and again in 2001, 2002 and between 2004 and 2006, in 2013, and once again from 2018.

Filmography

Films

Television

References

External links 
 

Living people
Italian actresses
Italian television presenters
Actors from Venice
1950 births
Italian women television presenters